Natalia Sokol, aka Koza, is the leader of the Russian highly political art-group Voina.

Life and work 
Natalia Sokol, together with her husband Oleg Vorotnikov (Vor of Voina), is a founder of Voina, a political artist group in Russia, which formed in 2005.

Since its formation, Voina has made headlines for agitating public space and openly critiquing the Putin administration.

Natalia Sokol, better known by her artistic name Koza, is the author, coordinator, and performer of the Voina works, including, but not limited to:

 Mordovian Hour, 2007, Throwing Cats in McDonald's 
 Fuck for the heir Puppy Bear!, 2008, Pre-Election Orgy in Biological Museum 
 Cop in a Priest's Robe, 2008, 21st Century Russian Hero Gets Food for the Comrades by Robbing a Supermarket 
 Decembrists Commemoration, 2008, Voina Сelebrates Moscow City Day by Executing through Hanging Two Homosexuals and Three Illegal Migrant Workers inside the City's Biggest Mall 
 Storming the White House, 2008, Voina Troop Takes the Russian Parliament under the Skull and Bones Laser Drawing 
 Cock in the Ass, 2009, Punk Concert in the Court 
 Leo the Fucknut is Our President!, 2010, Blue Bucket Attack on President's Guard Limousine 
 Dick Captured by KGB, 2010, Giant Dick on Bridge 
 Palace Revolution, 2010, Reformation of the Ministry of Police by Playing Football with a Child

While Koza was working as an artist and activist in Russia, she experienced clashes with the Russian police.

On March 3, 2011, Natalia Sokol was beaten up by the police squad on the streets after a public lecture. Her camera was broken, and her child and other activists were injured.

On March 31, 2011, Kasper, the son of Natalia Sokol, was kidnapped during a demonstration on the street in the center of St. Petersburg by the Russian police. Both parents were arrested. Later, Sokol and her husband discovered that the police had brought their child as unidentified into the City Children's Hospital. The family reunited after Sokol escaped from a police van.

Another criminal case against Sokol was opened in which she was accused of assaulting and insulting police officers. It is alleged she was then pressured and threatened by the Russian authorities with both forced labor and imprisonment. This was announced in a Russia-wide criminal investigation. Sokol was arrest warrant was issued in her absence, while the Russian police announced that Sokol was also declared an internationally wanted criminal searched by Interpol.

In the night of October 18, 2011, Sokol and her 2-year-old son Kasper were arrested after the meeting with German TV-channel ARD. They escaped after spending a night behind bars.

In December 2011, the Dzerzhinsky District Court in St. Petersberug issued an arrest warrant for Natalia Sokol. Voina claimed that Natalia Sokol has been charged with insulting and using violence against police officers (articles 319 and 318 of the Criminal Code). The charges were first revealed to the defense during a court session on December 6, 2011, and she has been a federally wanted person since November, and she was declared internationally wanted. Her attorney expressed his indignation and denied investigator Rud's claims that Natalia had missed her appointments with the investigator on multiple occasions. However, the judge sided with the investigators to arrest Natalia Sokol in absentia.

At that time Sokol, who was pregnant with her second child, consulted a specialized medical facility "Women Consultant", where she sought for medical help. Instead, the doctors called the police. Mama, the daughter of Sokol was born in hiding.

Sokol studied Molecular Physics in the Lomonosov Moscow State University. She finished with a PHD on "Optical Properties of Protein Solutions Containing Heavy Metal Ions" in 2006. She then began working at the Department of Molecular Physics, Faculty of Physics, MSU, planning to continue her research work in relation to the fight against blood cancer. As she was a member of Voina already, this career was not compatible with the State University objectives. April 17, 2012, she was illegally, in violation of Russian law, fired from MSU at the time of leave to care for a second newborn baby Mama.

In 2012 Natalia together with other leaders of Voina was announced as an associated curator of Berlin Biennale.

On April 28, 2015, Natalia Sokol announced in Switzerland, on occasion of a public event in Zürich, to ask for political asylum, claiming that her husband and her children aged four and six are still in Russia.

She managed to arrive in Switzerland on the ninth month of her third pregnancy. However, Natalia came separately. Her two kids, Kasper (6 years) and Mama (3 years), as well as her husband, co-founder of Voina Oleg Vorotnikov, are unable to join her to come here legally, due to the fact that they still live without documents. Oleg Vorotnikov is among wanted persons in the Interpol list since November 2011.

March 20, 2016, Natalia Sokol, Oleg Vorotnikov and their three children Kasper, Mama, and Troitsa were attacked by an armed mob of 20 people in their apartment in Basel. The perpetrators broke the door to family's apartment, attacked the parents and children with tear gas and kidnapped the naked children while they were taking baths. Then the perpetrators fixed Oleg's hands and legs with scotch tape and started to strangle him. After they blocked Oleg, the father of kids, they attacked Natalia, the mother of kids, and horribly beat her with wood sticks. The attackers robbed Voina's laptops and hard drives with the artistic and science archives and iPads of kids.

November 10, 2017, Voina published the video documentation of the violent crime against the leaders of the group Oleg Vorotnikov and Natalya Sokol, and their kids in Basel, Switzerland. The video shows an armed attack on the family of Vorotnikov and Sokol and the kidnapping of their kids by an armed group of the ‘Wasserstrasse’ organization, self-proclaimed Swiss human right activists.

The video of the crime was confiscated by the police.

The Basel prosecutor office opened a criminal case against Natalia Sokol and Oleg Vorotnikov for their attempts to attract attention of the media to what happened to family in Basel, Switzerland, March 20, 2016.

The official prosecution to identified perpetrators who attacked Voina family at March 20, 2016, are multiple kidnapping, deprivation of liberty, repeated attempts to endanger life, multiple coercion, physical assault, multiple attempts to inflict serious bodily injury, robbery, intentional appropriation of property, multiple material damage, violation of inviolability of home, trespassing, multiple violence and threat to authorities and officials public order disturbance.

Amnesty International acknowledged the xenophobic nature of the attack on family in Switzerland.

Vorotnikov stated (in an interview with Radio Free Europe) that the family wanted to return Russia but worries about the fate of their three children prevented this.

On March 2, 2018, Voina arrived in Graz, Austria, to participate in the Elevate Festival under the topic 'Risk and Courage'. At the festival, a documentary of the kidnapping Voina's kids by an armed group of Swiss extremists was presented to the public for the first time. There was a scandal, provocation and some participants of the festival requested to be completely removed from this video recording.

On September 11, 2018, Natalia Sokol and her three children were arrested in the residence of the Voina Group in the Eastern Alps, the Federal Land of Styria, just after the children returned from school. Sokol and her children were escorted to the city prison of Graz (PAZ Graz: 8010 Graz Sauraugasse 1), where they all were imprisoned in the cell no. 303.

On September 20, 2018, the European arrest warrant (EAW) for Sokol's husband, the leader of the Voina Group, Oleg Vorotnikov (Vor of Voina) on charges of illegal weapons possession and trafficking was issued by the Austrian police.

The Austrian authorities used the 'Einsatzkommando Cobra' special anti-terrorism unit, equipped with helicopters and a squad with dogs to search and arrest Vorotnikov. 'Cobra' stormed the Voina residence, partly destroying the mountain chalet.

On the appeal accepted by Judge Markus Mayrhold to consider at the Federal Administrative Court of the Republic of Austria in Vienna, the details of the arrest and imprisonment of Sokol and her children in Graz City Prison were revealed. As confirmed in court, Sokol and her children were kept in torture conditions and subjected to round-the-clock surveillance in prison. On September 12, 2018, the prison guards attacked the mother in front of the children. Two warders beat Sokol with an iron door of the 'family' cell no. 303 for a request to give the children their warm clothes confiscated during the arrest. Walks in the prison yard are prohibited both to mother and the children throughout the entire term of imprisonment.

In May 2019, together with her husband and the leader of Voina Oleg Vorotnikov, Sokol was charged by the Austrian police with creating and running a militant anti-fascist group and arms trafficking. Citing a final version of the indictment, Sokol has been charged with involvement in the creation and leadership of a militant group called ‘Der Krieg’ (‘The War’ or ‘Voina’ in Russian). Austria has issued an international warrant for Vorotnikov's arrest.

The group's activity, according to the indictment, is aimed at inciting murder and violence, causing serious material damage to governmental property, military infrastructure, culture monuments and sites of religious worship as well as inflicting serious bodily harm on officials on duty and perpetrating a range of other offences.

Sokol is also charged with arms trafficking on the territory of Austria. In a previous indictment filed in January 2019, she was charged with weapons smuggling. However, that charge was dropped after all melee weapons and firearms seized from her at the time were found to be of Austrian origin.

Sokol and her three children were imprisoned in Austria until January 2019, and then transferred to the Traiskirchen refugee camp. Sokol was taken into custody in September 2018 as Vorotnikov's alleged accomplice in the creation of Der Krieg and the arms trade.

See also 
 Voina
 Der Krieg

References 

Living people
Russian artists
1980 births